St. Luke's Hospital may refer to:

Australia
 St Lukes Private Hospital, Launceston, Tasmania
 St Luke's Private Hospital, Sydney, New South Wales

Canada
 Hôpital Saint-Luc, Montreal, Quebec

China
 Shanghai Chest Hospital, formerly St. Luke's Hospital

Greece
 St. Luke's Hospital (Panorama, Thessaloniki), a hospital in Greece

Ireland
 St. Luke's Hospital, Clonmel
 St. Luke's General Hospital, Kilkenny
 St. Luke's Hospital, Rathgar, Dublin

Japan
 St. Luke's International Hospital

Malta
 St. Luke's Hospital, Malta

Philippines
 St. Luke's Medical Center
 St. Luke's Medical Center – Global City
 St. Luke's Medical Center – Quezon City

Singapore
 St Luke's Hospital, Singapore

United Kingdom
 St Luke's Hospital, Bradford
 St Luke's Hospital, Guildford
 St Luke's Hospital, Huddersfield
 St Luke's Hospital, Middlesbrough
 St Luke's Hospital, Rugby, open from 1948 to 1993
 St Luke's Hospital for the Clergy, London
 St Luke's Hospital for Lunatics, London, open from 1751 to 1916

United States
 Aurora St. Luke's Medical Center, part of the Aurora Health Care hospital system, Milwaukee, Wisconsin
 Avera St. Luke's Hospital, Aberdeen, South Dakota
 Faxton St. Luke's Healthcare, Utica, New York
 St. Luke's Hospital (San Francisco, California)
 St Luke Medical Center (Pasadena, California) (Closed in 2002) 
 Old St. Luke's Hospital, a former hospital building in Jacksonville, Florida, listed on the National Register of Historic Places
 St. Luke's Hospital (Jacksonville, Florida), now known as St. Vincent's Medical Center Southside
 St. Luke's Boise Medical Center, Idaho
 St. Luke's Hospital (Chicago, Illinois), listed on the National Register of Historic Places in Illinois
 St. Luke's Hospital (Cedar Rapids, Iowa)
 St. Luke's Hospital (Davenport, Iowa), listed on the National Register of Historic Places listings in Iowa
 St. Luke's Regional Medical Center (Sioux City, Iowa)
 St. Luke's Hospital, Middleborough, Massachusetts
 St. Luke's Hospital (New Bedford, Massachusetts)
 St. Luke's Hospital (Duluth, Minnesota), a hospital in Minnesota
 St. Luke's Hospital (Chesterfield, Missouri)
 Saint Luke's Hospital of Kansas City
 St. Luke's–Roosevelt Hospital Center, Manhattan, New York City (now Mount Sinai Morningside)
 St. Luke's Cornwall Hospital, a hospital in Newburgh and Cornwall, New York
 St. Luke's Hospital (Columbus, North Carolina), part of the Atrium Health hospital system
 St. Luke's Hospital (Cleveland, Ohio), listed on the National Register of Historic Places listings in Ohio
 St. Luke's Hospital (Maumee, Ohio)
 St. Luke's University Health Network, including St. Luke's Hospital in Bethlehem, Pennsylvania
 St. Luke's Episcopal Hospital, Houston, Texas
 St. Luke's Rehabilitation Institute, formerly St. Luke's Hospital, Spokane, Washington
 Tempe St. Luke's Hospital, Tempe, Arizona; part of the Steward Health Care System

See also
 Saint Luke (disambiguation)
 St. Luke's (disambiguation)